Melindea opaca is a species of leaf beetle of the Democratic Republic of the Congo, described by Julius Weise in 1915.

References 

Eumolpinae
Beetles of the Democratic Republic of the Congo
Taxa named by Julius Weise
Beetles described in 1915
Endemic fauna of the Democratic Republic of the Congo